19738 Calinger, provisional designation , is a background asteroid from the inner regions of the asteroid belt, approximately 3 kilometers in diameter.

It was discovered  on 4 January 2000, by members of the Lincoln Near-Earth Asteroid Research team at Lincoln Laboratory's Experimental Test Site in Socorro, New Mexico, and named after DCYSC-mentor Manetta Calinger.

Classification and orbit 

Calinger is a non-family asteroid from the main belt's background population. It orbits the Sun in the inner asteroid belt at a distance of 1.9–2.7 AU once every 3 years and 5 months (1,260 days). Its orbit has an eccentricity of 0.18 and an inclination of 8° with respect to the ecliptic.

The body's observation arc begins almost 10 years prior to its official discovery observation, with a precovery from the Digitized Sky Survey taken at Palomar Observatory in May 1990.

Physical characteristics 

According to the surveys carried out by the Infrared Astronomical Satellite IRAS, the Japanese Akari satellite, and NASA's Wide-field Infrared Survey Explorer with its subsequent NEOWISE mission, Calinger measures 3.272 kilometers in diameter and its surface has a high albedo of 0.314. It has an absolute magnitude of 14.1.

Lightcurves 

As of 2017, Calinger rotation period and shape remain unknown.

Naming 

This minor planet was named after Manetta Calinger who mentored a finalist in the 2003 Discovery Channel Youth Science Challenge, DCYSC. The approved naming citation was published by the Minor Planet Center on 10 October 2003.

References

External links 
 Asteroid Lightcurve Database (LCDB), query form (info )
 Dictionary of Minor Planet Names, Google books
 Asteroids and comets rotation curves, CdR – Observatoire de Genève, Raoul Behrend
 Discovery Circumstances: Numbered Minor Planets (15001)-(20000) – Minor Planet Center
 
 

019738
019738
Named minor planets
20000104